Andrew Guerra (born 25 February 1998) is an American rugby union player, currently playing for the New Orleans Gold of Major League Rugby (MLR) and the United States national team. His preferred position is flanker.

Professional career
Guerra signed for Major League Rugby side New Orleans Gold for the 2021 Major League Rugby season. Guerra made his debut for United States against Ireland during the 2021 July rugby union tests.

References

External links
itsrugby.co.uk Profile

1998 births
Living people
United States international rugby union players
Rugby union flankers
American rugby union players
New Orleans Gold players